Juan Bautista de Orendáin y Azpilicueta, 1st Marquess of the Peace, (16 October 1683 in Segura, Gipuzkoa – 21 October 1734 in Madrid) was a Spanish politician who served as Prime minister in 1724 and between 1726 and 1734.

Biography 
Born in the Basque Country, he moved to Yepes and later Madrid after his marriage with Castilian Hipólita Casado Busto. Here he became the protégé of Prime Minister José de Grimaldo and was introduced to the Royal Court.

When King Philip V of Spain abdicated from the throne in favor of his son Louis I of Spain, José de Grimaldo also stood down as Prime Minister (Secretary of the Universal Bureau) and Orendáin succeeded him. But when King Louis died from smallpox just seven months later, Philip V of Spain was forced to return to the Spanish throne. José de Grimaldo followed in his footsteps and replaced Orendáin as prime minister. Orendaín became Minister of the Treasury.

The next year, together with Juan Guillermo Ripperdá, he was sent to Vienna where he negotiated the Treaty of Vienna (1725) with the former enemy. This treaty opened perspectives to regain former Spanish possessions in Italy. 
At their return, Riperdá was made a Duke and also replaced Grimaldo, who favoured a treaty with Great Britain. Orendáin received the title of Marqués de la Paz (Marquess of Peace).

In October 1726 Orendáin became Prime Minister for the second time and he supported the aggressive foreign policy of Queen Elisabeth Farnese to regain former Spanish possessions in Italy.

He stayed in office until his death, aged 55, on 21 October 1734.

Sources 

 Euskomedia
 Basques, ORENDAIN AZPILCUETA, JUAN BAUTISTA
 Censo Archivos
 Ministros de Hacienda de 1700 a 2004. Tres siglos de Historia

See also
 List of prime ministers of Spain

1683 births
1734 deaths
Prime Ministers of Spain
Economy and finance ministers of Spain
18th-century Spanish nobility